Josef "Pepi" Reiter (born 8 January 1959) is a retired judoka from Austria, who represented his native country at three consecutive Summer Olympics. He is a seventh degree black belt.

He was born in Niederwaldkirchen, Oberösterreich.

Reiter won the bronze medal in the men's lightweight division (-65 kg), alongside Marc Alexandre of France, at the 1984 Summer Olympics in Los Angeles, California.

References

External links

 
 
 
 sports-reference.com
 Profile 
 Josef Reiter on webpage of his club 

1959 births
Living people
Austrian male judoka
Judoka at the 1980 Summer Olympics
Judoka at the 1984 Summer Olympics
Judoka at the 1988 Summer Olympics
Olympic judoka of Austria
Olympic bronze medalists for Austria
Olympic medalists in judo
Medalists at the 1984 Summer Olympics
People from Rohrbach District
Sportspeople from Upper Austria
20th-century Austrian people
21st-century Austrian people